George Robert McAvoy (March 12, 1884 – August 19, 1952), was a Major League Baseball player who played in  with the Philadelphia Phillies.

McAvoy played in 1 game, going 0-1 as a pinch hitter.  Despite his brief appearance in the Majors, he played minor league baseball from 1908 through 1922, and was primarily a second baseman. He also had some time as a player/manager in the minors from 1910-1912 and 1914.

He was born in East Liverpool, Ohio and died in Miami, Florida.

External links

Baseball players from Ohio
Philadelphia Phillies players
1884 births
1952 deaths
Clarksburg Drummers players
Dallas Giants players
Shreveport Pirates (baseball) players
Galveston Sand Crabs players
Sapulpa Oilers players
East Liverpool Potters (baseball) players
San Francisco Seals (baseball) players
Fort Worth Panthers players
Scranton Miners players
Muskogee Mets players
Oakland Oaks (baseball) players
Grand Rapids Black Sox players
Wichita Jobbers players
Toledo Iron Men players
Evansville Evas players
Galveston Pirates players
Moline Plowboys players
Durham Bulls players
Minor league baseball managers
People from East Liverpool, Ohio